Waada is a Pakistani drama television series directed by Syed Atif Hussain, written by  Samina Ejaz. It originally aired on ARY Digital in 2016.

Cast

Shaista Lodhi as Sumaira
Faisal Qureshi as Shahab
Saboor Ali as Jaana
Ismat Iqbal as Nuzhat
Srha Asghar as Uzma
Anum Tanveer as Lubna
Fahad Sheikh
Hassan Ahmed
Ghazala Butt
Amir Qureshi 
and others.

Plot
Sumaira is a loving wife, mother and daughter in-law. She cares for everyone in the family and tries to do as much as she can for everyone at home. She makes an effort to fulfill her promise and excel in every relationship. Loyalty is all that she has to offer besides so much love.

Shahab is financially very secure as he is a rich businessman but along with that he also cares for his entire family, basically he's a good husband. He promises his wife that he will never leave her no matter what and stand by her side in all the ups and downs.

Jaana is the maid's daughter who gets kicked out from her previous job due to falling for the owner's son who hates her. Jaana hunts for her next victim who turns out to be Shahab and disrupts his life. She schemes against Sumaira till Shahab too falls for her and she ends up marrying him.
.

See also 
 List of programs broadcast by ARY Digital
 2016 in Pakistani television

References

External links 
 

Pakistani drama television series
2016 Pakistani television series debuts
2017 Pakistani television series endings
Urdu-language television shows
ARY Digital original programming
ARY Digital